Prabda Yoon (born 2 August 1973 in Bangkok) is a Thai writer, novelist, filmmaker, artist, graphic designer, magazine editor, screenwriter, translator and media personality. His literary debut, Muang Moom Shak (City of Right Angles), a collection of five related stories about New York City, and the follow-up story collection, Kwam Na Ja Pen (Probability), both published in 2000, immediately turned him into "...the talk of the town..." In 2002, Kwam Na Ja Pen won the S.E.A. Write Award, an award presented to accomplished Southeast Asian writers and poets.
 
Prabda has been prolific, having written over 20 books of fiction and nonfiction in ten years, designed over 100 book covers for many publishers and authors, translated a number of modern Western classics such as Vladimir Nabokov's Lolita and Pnin, all of J. D. Salinger's books, Anthony Burgess's' A Clockwork Orange, and Karel Čapek's R.U.R. He has also written two acclaimed screenplays for Thai "new wave" filmmaker Pen-Ek Ratanaruang, "Last Life in the Universe" (2003) and "Invisible Waves" (2006). Prabda's literary work has been translated to Japanese and published in Japan regularly. He has exhibited his artworks (paintings, drawings, installations) in Thailand and Japan. He has also produced music and written songs with the bands Buahima and The Typhoon Band.

In 2004, Prabda founded Typhoon Studio, a small publishing house with two imprints, Typhoon Books and Sunday Afternoon. In 2012, he opened Bookmoby Readers' Cafe, a small bookshop at the Bangkok Art and Culture Centre. In 2015, Prabda wrote and directed his first feature film, "Motel Mist", which was selected to premiere and compete at the International Film Festival Rotterdam in 2016. The Sad Part Was, a collection of twelve  short stories mostly taken from Prabda's Kwam Na Ja Pen in English, translated from Thai by Mui Poopoksakul (who won an English PEN Award for her translation), was published by the London-based independent publisher, Tilted Axis, and released in the UK on 3 March 2017. It is said to be the first translation of Thai fiction to be published in the UK. He received the 2021 Fukuoka Prize in Arts and Culture.

Family and education
Prabda is the son of the well known Thai media personality Suthichai Sae-Yoon, cofounder of The Nation newspaper, and former magazine editor and novelist Nantawan Sae-Yoon, both of Bangkok. He has one younger sister, Shimboon "Kit" Yoon, who lives with her family in the US. Prabda completed his elementary school education in Bangkok, then attended high school at the Cambridge School of Weston in Weston, Massachusetts. He went to Parsons School of Design in Manhattan, New York City, for two years, studying communication design, and four more years at the Cooper Union, where he studied graphic design under Dan Friedman and Milton Glaser and film with Robert Breer. He graduated from Cooper Union in 1997. Prabda returned to Thailand in 1998 for military service.

Works

Short stories
 Right-angled City
 Probability
 Flood in the Eyes
 The Moving Parts
 This Really happened
 The Shoulders of Mountains
 Cleaning the Dead
 Ancient Planet

Novels
 Chit-tak!, 2002
 Panda, 2004
 Lessons in Rain, 2005
 Under the Snow, 2006

Essays
 Unstill Pictures
 Water for the Skull
 Please Don't Read, Carefully
 Alive: On the Breath of Words
 Imagined Landscapes
 Page Zero
 Hitting the Eyes
 Writing to Japan
 Music with Tears

Screenplays
 Last Life in the Universe, with Pen-Ek Ratanaruang, 2003
 Invisible Waves, 2006
 Motel Mist, 2015

References

External links
 Teh, David, "Picking up the pieces", Bangkok Post, (2005-12-24)
 Typhoon Studio
 
 Artificial Eye
 RMA 2016 interviews Prabda Yoon on Motel Mist
 Prabda Yoon speaking at Creative Morning, Turin, 2018

Prabda Yoon
Prabda Yoon
Prabda Yoon
Prabda Yoon
1973 births
Living people
S.E.A. Write Award winners
Cooper Union alumni
Prabda Yoon
Prabda Yoon
Prabda Yoon
20th-century novelists
21st-century novelists
20th-century translators
21st-century translators
Prabda Yoon
Prabda Yoon